This is a list of bridges and other crossings of the Halifax River.

Crossings

See also
 
 
 
 List of crossings of the Aucilla River
 List of crossings of the St. Johns River
 List of crossings of the Ochlockonee River
 List of crossings of the Suwannee River

References

Halifax River
Halifax River

Crossings